The Mayor of Tower Hamlets was a position first established in 1965 with the creation of the London Borough of Tower Hamlets. It replaced the mayors of Bethnal Green, Poplar and Stepney.

The post holder is elected at a full council meeting in May of each year, and serves for one municipal year. From 1965, the mayor could be a councillor or alderman, until the position of alderman was abolished in 1978. It is customary for the mayor to have served as the deputy mayor in the preceding year.

In 2010, a directly elected mayor of Tower Hamlets was established. The civic mayor position was renamed as the Chair of Council in October 2010 and Speaker of Council in November 2011.

Mayor

1965 T. H. A. Mitchell
1966 Ald J. Orwell
1967 M. J. Durell
1968 F. W. Briden
1969 E. G. Walker
1970 Ald J. Orwell
1971 W. Harris
1972 Ald H. F. Rackley 
1973 G. T. Desmond
1974 G. R. Chaney
1975 B. Holmes
1976 D. Kelly
1977 J. Riley
1978 A. S. Dorrell
1979 E. Armsby
1980 L. Crook
1981 P. Thompson
1982 J. C. O'Neill
1983 E. D. Penner
1984 R. W. Ashkettle
1985 P. Beasley
1986 B. Williams
1987 B. Williams
1988 B. C. Duffy
1989 J. A. Shaw
1990 J. Ludlow
1991 B. A. Blandford
1992 K. B. Appiah
1993 J. Snooks
1994 A. Downes
1995 G. Mortuza
1996 A. Jacob
1997 J. Ramanoop
1998 A. Asad
1999 D. Jones
2000 Soyful Alom
2001 L. Melvin
2002 S. Ullah
2003 Abdul Aziz Sardar
2004 Manir Uddin Ahmed 
2005 Doros Ullah
2006 Shafiqul Haque
2007 Ann Jackson
2008 Mohammed Abdus Salique
2009 Ahmed Omer
2010 Motin Uz-Zaman

Chair of Council
2010 Motin Uz-Zaman
2011 Mizan Chaudhury

Speaker of Council
2011 Mizan Chaudhury
2012 Rajib Ahmed
2013 Lesley Pavitt
2014 Mohammed Mukit 
2015 Marc Francis 
2016 Khales Uddin Ahmed
2017 Sabina Akhtar
2018 Ayas Miah
2019 Victoria Obaze

Notes

References

Politics of the London Borough of Tower Hamlets
 
Tower Hamlets